The 2000 CPSL League Cup was the 3rd edition of the Canadian Professional Soccer League's league cup tournament running from July through late September. Toronto Olympians successfully defended their league cup title after defeating the St. Catharines Roma Wolves 1-0 at Birchmount Stadium in Toronto, Ontario, thus establishing a tournament record of most consecutive title wins. The format used in the competition was the traditional group stage with the winners of each group receiving an automatic bye to the semi-finals.

Group stage

Group A

Group B

Quarter-final

Semi-final

Final

References 

CPSL League Cup
CPSL League Cup
CPSL League Cup